Talya Lavie (born 1978) is an Israeli filmmaker best known for her 2014 debut feature, Zero Motivation.

Early life
Lavie attended the Bezalel Academy of Arts and Design as well as the Sam Spiegel Film and Television School in Jerusalem. While attending the schools she produced three shorts which were screened at numerous international film festivals, and won prizes at Locarno International Film Festival and the Berlin International Film Festival.

Career
In 2006 she created a 19-minute short called The Substitute which played at the Tribeca Film Festival about a young woman working for the IDF. This short was later developed into a feature-length film, Zero Motivation. 

In 2010 she participated in the Sundance Institute Feature Film Program Screenwriters' Lab, and in 2011 she participated in the Sundance Institute prestigious Directors' Lab. 

Lavie was inspired to write Zero Motivation based on her own experience serving in the Israel Defense Forces. The film premiered at the 2014 Tribeca Film Festival where it won Best Narrative Feature in the World Narrative Competition. It was given a limited release in the U.S. in December, 2014 by Zeitgeist Films. The film was nominated for 12 Ophir Awards and went on to win 6 of them, including two for Lavie herself for Best Director and Best Screenplay.

Her second feature film Honeymood, a bride and groom romantic comedy starring Ran Danker and Avigail Harari, competed at the San Diego International Film Festival in October 2020. WestEnd Films has obtained worldwide distribution rights.

In 2021 she directed and co-created the TV series Sad City Girls, which premiered in the Canneseries festival.

Awards and nominations
Best Director Ophir Awards 2014 - Zero Motivation
Best Screenplay Ophir Awards 2014 - Zero Motivation
Best Narrative Feature Tribeca Film Festival 2014 - Zero Motivation
Nora Ephron Prize Tribeca Film Festival 2014 - Zero Motivation

References

External links

1978 births
Living people
Bezalel Academy of Arts and Design alumni
Israeli female screenwriters
Israeli women film directors
Israeli female military personnel
Place of birth missing (living people)